O. carnea may refer to:

 Ochagavia carnea, a bromeliad endemic to Chile
 Onchidiopsis carnea, a sea snail
 Opodiphthera carnea, a moth endemic to Australia
 Orchis carnea, an orchid endemic to Cape Province
 Oreta carnea, a hook tip moth
 Orobanche carnea, a herbaceous plant